The Imperial Korean Armed Forces (대한제국군) was the military of the Korean Empire.

Foundation
Succeeding the Joseon Army and Navy, the Gwangmu Reform reorganized the military into a modern western-style military. The foundation of the Imperial Korean Army started when Inoue Kaoru argued that the King should modernize the military and the commanding system in 1895. Korea established many military academies in Korea. Gojong of Korea tried to install his guards, but because of the interruptions of Japan, it was hard to use the Capital Guards (Siwidae) as his palace guards. But when the Japanese were being interrupted by other European countries, the Siwidae was formed as Gojong's guards. The minister of the military supervises the training of the Siwidae. However, the Siwidae was disbanded in August of that year for failing to stop the Japanese from assassinating Empress Myeongseong.

Organization
The military system of the Korean Empire consisted of imperial guards, central troops, and provincial troops. It consisted of infantry, artillery, machine gunners, and cavalry. Unlike in the Joseon Dynasty, service was voluntary.

Ministry of Military
In 1895, the government established the Ministry of Military as part of the Gabo Reform. The job of the ministry was to control the military government and supervise military forces and bases. The first Minister of Military was Cho Hui-yon.

Board of Marshals
In 1899, in order to strengthen the military, the Board of Marshals was established. Emperor Gojong set this to concentrate all rights to military command to him.

Training

The Imperial Korean Army had 44 barracks, formally training in marksmanship and drills. Foreign military officers like the Russians volunteered to train the soldiers. Aside from the military academies, there was also the need to educate new officers. In 1896, the military established the Yeonmugongwon (연무공원,鍊武公院), the Military Academy of the Korean Empire, with an officer training program to begin making the Imperial Korean Army more on par with that of the Chinese and Japanese.

The purpose of the training was to make troops more useful on the battlefield. Officers higher than company leaders were responsible for enlisted men and officers' training. Also, training was done in many environments and in many different ways to make the troops more suitable for war.

Imperial Korean Army

In 1897, the Imperial Korean Army comprised the central army and the provincial armies. It was as part of strengthening the Korean Empire's National Defense. The central army's backbone is the Imperial Guard consisting of the Attendant (Chinwidae), and Retinue (Howidae) Guards, and the Capital Guard. The central army was directly under the Board of Marshal's member, Marshal Jung Ae-Kun to defend the emperor and the capital city of Hanyang. The provincial armies (Jibangdae) and the garrison guards (Jinwidae) defend the borders. With the central and provincial armies, the army grew immensely to 28,000 before 1907.

In 1904, the editor of Jeguk Sinmun criticized the incapacity of the army that foreigners employed their foreign army instead of the Korean Army, which shows that the Korean army is under the standard.

Central Army
In 1895, the Imperial Attendant Guard served as the army's core and palace guards. The Attendant Guard grew to two battalions of 1,700 troops, each battalion consisting of companies of 220 men. In March 1896, Gojong added three more battalions to the Attendant Guard, establishing a total of five battalions with 4,400 men. The Ministry of the Interior assigned the 3rd battalion as the Imperial Retinue Guard. They were directly in charge of escorting the Imperial Family nearby, and Gojong was in charge of the Retinue Guard before the Gabo Reform. But after the reform, the Ministers of the Palace, Military, Finance, and Education concurrently holds the position of commander of the Attendant Guard. They reorganized the Retinue Guard into an engineer corps. Still, they disbanded due to unstable domestic situations. In April 22nd, Gojong reorganized two battalions into one regiment divided by ten companies which followed the Russian military system. It consisted of one independent battalion, and another battalion into a cavalry battalion. In 1900, Gojong reestablished the Retinue Guard with 730 soldiers. In 1902, the Attendant Guard expanded to two regiments. 

In 1897, the military reestablished the Capital Guards to serve as part of the central army and as the Gyeongungung palace guards. It consisted of some units of the Attendant Guard with one battalion of 1,000 men divided by five companies as its organization method and recruited Russian officers to train them. It soon expanded into a regiment of 1,070 troops, with up to 200 guards each company. Then each regiment has expanded into three infantry battalions of 3,000 troops and one artillery battalion of 652 men consisting of one artillery company and two mountain artillery companies. As of October 1902, the military established an additional regiment making two regiments and one independent cavalry battalion of 4,300 troops. Each regiment has four infantry battalions, two artillery battalions, and a cavalry battalion under the direct control of the Board of Marshals, such as the 1st Siwi Regiment. Then it grew to a total number of troops was 4,672 men, 400 cavalry, and 102 military bands, totaling 5,174 men.

Provincial Army

The Board of Marshals administers the provincial armies. In May 1896, they expanded and divided them into eight battalions ranging from 200 to 600 troops and assigned battalion commanders (majors) to command them. But in September 1896, the standard number of troops in a unit drew to 400 troops, and they expanded into fourteen battalions with 5,600 troops. They also served as a transitional military unit to reorganize outdated soldiers into the first modern provincial army, the Garrison Guard. In 1899. On June 30th, 1900, King Gojong ordered the Board of Marshals to incorporate some provincial battalions into the Garrison Guard. At first, the military deployed one garrison guard battalion to Jeonju and Pyongyang, and each battalion consisted of two companies. However, in the case of the garrison guard battalion in Pyeongyang, which was in charge of the defense of the north, it followed the central army method of one battalion of 1,000 men divided by five companies. The Garrison Guard forces grew significantly to prevent foreign interference and stabilize the regime. In July 1900, the army established 18 battalions into six Garrison Guard regiments with headquarters in Ganghwa, Suwon, Daegu, Pyongyang, Bukcheong, Uiju, and Jeju. Which then on August 1901 expanded into six divisions totaling 18,000 soldiers.

Imperial Korean Navy
In 1903, the government of the Korean Empire purchased its first modern ship, the Yangmu. The KIS Yangmu, however, was not as efficient as it looked because of its previous use as a cargo ship. The annexation of Korea by the Empire of Japan disrupted Korean naval tradition from 1910 until 1945.

Retirement 
Imperial Korean Army had a retiring age. Colonel-General did not have a retiring age, Lieutenant General should retire at 70, and Major General should retire at 65. Senior Officers should retire at the age of 54, Captain should retire at the age of 48, and First lieutenant, Second lieutenant, and Non-commissioned officer should retire at the age of 45. But these retiring age can lengthen.

From 1909, personnels after the retirement got pension. Lieutenant Generals got 480 Hwan, Major Generals got 420 Hwan, Colonels got 360 Hwan, Lieutenant Colonels got 300 Hwan, Majors got 240 Hwan, Captains got 180 Hwan, First Lieutenants got 144 Hwan, and Second Lieutenants got 120 Hwan. Personnels after the retirement should notify in order to get the pension. If the recipients of pension commits serious crime or lose the allegiance of Korea, pension was not given any more.

Budget 
The Korean Empire had used a lot of money as army budget. Army Budget of Korean Empire from 1895-1905:

Dissolution 
After Japan's victory in the Russo-Japanese War in 1905, the Japanese forced the Korean Empire to sign the Japan–Korea Treaty of 1905. As per the treaty, the Korean government disbanded the Navy and reduced the numbers of the Imperial Army's City Guards and the Garrison Guards. The total number of Garrison Guards was less than 3,000. Their ships, such as the Guangjae, transported coal from 1941 until Korea's independence from Japan. The army disbanded on August 1st, 1907, as per the Japan–Korea Treaty of 1907. From midnight, it rained in Seoul. There was an order to gather in Namdaemun. In Namdaemun, Major Park Seung-hwan committed suicide out of guilt for not protecting the country. His death incited the Korean Army to loot their armories and fight against the Japanese army, beginning the Battle of Namdaemun. Still, the Japanese anticipated this and suppressed them after nearly four hours of fighting. On August 30th, 1907, the officers disbanded too. Emperor Sunjong's incorporated the remaining soldiers into the Imperial Retinue Guard, which continued even after the annexation in 1910. Fortunately, after disbanding the central army in 1907, the provincial armies gradually separated. As a result, the provincial soldiers joined the Righteous Armies before the disbandment.

Ranks

Weapons
After signing the Treaty of Ganghwa, Japan, Qing, the United States, and the European nations started importing modern weapons such as rifles, artillery, and machine guns in 1883 until its annexation in 1910. From 1887, Gojong even tried to locally manufacture weapons, which never succeeded.

Ships

References

Bibliography 

 
 
 
 
 

Korean Empire
Military of Korea
Military history of Korea
Disbanded armed forces